This is a list of people who have served as Lord Lieutenant of Cumberland. From 1765 to 1974, all Lord Lieutenants were also Custos Rotulorum of Cumberland.
 

Henry Hastings, 3rd Earl of Huntingdon 20 August 1586 – 14 December 1595
vacant?
George Clifford, 3rd Earl of Cumberland 1603–1605
vacant?
Francis Clifford, 4th Earl of Cumberland 27 October 1607 – 31 August 1639 jointly with
George Home, 1st Earl of Dunbar 27 October 1607 – 20 January 1611 and
Theophilus Howard, 2nd Earl of Suffolk 27 October 1607 – 31 August 1639 and
Henry Clifford, 1st Baron Clifford 27 October 1607 – 31 August 1639 and
Algernon Percy, 10th Earl of Northumberland 13 November 1626 – 31 August 1639 and
Thomas Howard, 21st Earl of Arundel 23 July 1632 – 1642 and
Henry Howard, Lord Maltravers 23 July 1632 – 1642
Interregnum
Charles Howard, 1st Earl of Carlisle 1 October 1660 – 24 February 1685
Thomas Tufton, 6th Earl of Thanet 3 March 1685 – 1687
Richard Graham, 1st Viscount Preston 29 August 1687 – 1688
Sir John Lowther, 2nd Baronet 8 April 1689 – 1694
Charles Howard, 3rd Earl of Carlisle 28 June 1694 – 1 May 1738
Henry Lowther, 3rd Viscount Lonsdale 1 June 1738 – 7 March 1751
Charles Wyndham, 2nd Earl of Egremont 23 April 1751 – 1759
James Lowther, 1st Earl of Lonsdale 13 December 1759 – 24 May 1802
William Lowther, 1st Earl of Lonsdale 26 June 1802 – 19 March 1844
William Lowther, 2nd Earl of Lonsdale 3 May 1844 – 1868
Henry Lowther, 3rd Earl of Lonsdale 14 December 1868 – 15 August 1876
Josslyn Francis Pennington, 5th Baron Muncaster 3 October 1876 – 30 March 1917
Hugh Lowther, 5th Earl of Lonsdale 22 May 1917 – 13 April 1944
Frescheville Hubert Ballantine-Dykes 5 April 1944 – 1949
Sir Robert Christopher Chance 19 April 1949 – 1958
Sir Frederick Fergus Graham, 5th Baronet 12 December 1958 – 1968
John Charles Wade 27 May 1968 – 31 March 1974
The county became part of Cumbria on 31 March 1974. See Lord Lieutenant of Cumbria.

References
 

Cumberland
History of Cumberland
 
1974 establishments in England